Dr. K. C. Joseph (born 16 July 1949) is an Indian politician and former Member of the Kerala Legislative Assembly. He is the chairman of Janadhipathya Kerala Congress.

Joseph was born in Kuttanad, Kerala and completed his MBBS from the Government Medical College, Kozhikode in the year 1975.

He began his legislative career in 1977 from Perambra constituency in Kozhikode district and later from Kuttanad constituency in 1982, which he held for 24 years until 2006. In 1982, he was the first to be appointed the Government Chief Whip in the history of Kerala Legislative Assembly, where he served until 1987.

Joseph also has held the positions of  Deputy Leader, Kerala Congress Legislature Party Leader, Kerala Congress Legislature Party Syndicate Member, Cochin University and General Secretary, Kerala Congress (1979 –91).

References

Members of the Kerala Legislative Assembly
1949 births
Living people
People from Kozhikode district
Kerala Congress politicians